Zuptara (or Zupatra, Zubtara, Zupatra, Zipatra) was a Syriac Orthodox diocese in the Melitene region of eastern Turkey.  The diocese of Zuptara is attested between the eighth and eleventh centuries, and twelve of its bishops are mentioned in the lists of Michael the Syrian.  The diocese almost certainly lapsed during the twelfth century.

Sources 
The main primary source for the West Syriac bishops of Zuptara is the record of episcopal consecrations appended to Volume III of the Chronicle of the Syriac patriarch Michael the Syrian (1166–99).  In this Appendix Michael listed most of the bishops consecrated by the Syriac patriarchs of Antioch between the ninth and twelfth centuries. Twenty-eight Syriac patriarchs sat during this period, and in many cases Michael was able to list the names of the bishops consecrated during their reigns, their monasteries of origin, and the place where they were consecrated.

Location 
Zuptara was a small town to the southwest of Melitene (modern Malatya) in eastern Turkey.  It lay close to the border between the Byzantine Empire and the ʿAbbasid Caliphate, and for much of the ninth and tenth centuries it was disputed between the Byzantines and the Muslims.

Bishops of Zuptara 
Twelve Syriac Orthodox bishops of Zuptara between the eighth and eleventh centuries are mentioned in the lists of Michael the Syrian.

The diocese of Zuptara almost certainly lapsed during the twelfth century.

Notes

References 
 
 
 Jean-Baptiste Chabot, Chronique de Michel le Syrien, Patriarche Jacobite d'Antiche (1166-1199). Éditée pour la première fois et traduite en francais I-IV (1899;1901;1905;1910; a supplement to volume I containing an introduction to Michael and his work, corrections, and an index, was published in 1924. Reprinted in four volumes 1963, 2010).

Syriac Orthodox dioceses
Oriental Orthodoxy in Turkey